Ariel Aranda (born January 22, 1988) is an Argentine footballer who played for several Argentine clubs as well as for San Luis de Quillota of the Primera B Chilena.

External links
 
 

1988 births
Living people
Argentine expatriate footballers
Argentine footballers
San Telmo footballers
San Luis de Quillota footballers
Expatriate footballers in Chile
Primera B de Chile players
Association football forwards
People from Lomas de Zamora
Sportspeople from Buenos Aires Province